Gandhi Inter College is the oldest college of Charthaval, Muzaffarnagar district, Uttar Pradesh, India, situated at Rohana Road. Up to 12th class education is imparted in this school. The school was established around 1956. The architecture of Gandhi Inter College is well designed e.g. there are three sides wide and well ventilated class rooms, seven big green grass lawns inside the campus and a big playground in the school. Science, art, commerce and computer education is imparted in this school. Shree MangalSen Goel and Shree Chunna Lal Jain were among the main founders of this college.

Intermediate colleges in Uttar Pradesh
High schools and secondary schools in Uttar Pradesh
Muzaffarnagar district
Educational institutions established in 1956
1956 establishments in Uttar Pradesh